An inexact differential equation is a differential equation of the form (see also: inexact differential)

 

The solution to such equations came with the invention of the integrating factor by Leonhard Euler in 1739.

Solution method 
In order to solve the equation, we need to transform it into an exact differential equation. In order to do that, we need to find an integrating factor  to multiply the equation by. We'll start with the equation itself. , so we get . We will require  to satisfy . We get

After simplifying we get

or

References

Further reading

External links 
 A solution for an inexact differential equation from Stack Exchange
 a guide for non-partial inexact differential equations at SOS math

Equations
Differential equations
Ordinary differential equations
Differential calculus
Discrete mathematics
Mathematical structures